= Antigua and Barbuda Amateur Bodybuilding and Weightlifting Federation =

Sports governing body in Antigua and Barbuda

- Sport: Weightlifting
- Jurisdiction: Antigua and Barbuda
- Abbreviation: ABABWF
- Founded: 1965
- Affiliation: IWF
- Regional affiliation: PAWC
- Headquarters: St. John's
- President: Clayton D. Isaac
- (Antigua and Barbuda)

The Antigua and Barbuda Amateur Bodybuilding and Weightlifting Federation (ABABWF) is the governing body for the sport of weightlifting in Antigua and Barbuda.

== History ==
The body was founded in 1965 as the Antigua Weightlifting and Physical Culture Association (AWPCA) by Wesley Barrow. In 1985, the AWPCA's name was changed to the Antigua and Barbuda Amateur Bodybuilding and Weightlifting Federation (ABABWF). Since then, the name was changed with a directive from the IFBB to the current name of Antigua Barbuda Amateur Bodybuilding and Weightlifting Federation.
